Cristina Torrens Valero  (born 12 September 1974) is a former professional female tennis player from Spain. She won two singles and two doubles WTA titles. Cristina reached her career-high singles ranking world No. 27 on 4 March 2002.

In 1993, Torrens Valero helped Spain recapture the Fed Cup title.

WTA career finals

Singles: 5 (2 titles, 3 runner-ups)

Doubles: 4 (2 titles, 2 runner-ups)

ITF Circuit finals

Singles: 12 (6–6)

Doubles: 9 (5–4)

Grand Slam singles performance timeline

External links
 
 
 

1974 births
Living people
Spanish female tennis players
Sportspeople from Pamplona